Baron Frigyes Korányi de Tolcsva (21 June 1869 – 26 December 1935) was a Hungarian politician, who served as Minister of Finance at three times: from 1919 to 1920, in 1924, and from 1931 to 1932. 
His father was the internist Frigyes Korányi.  His mother was Malvin Bónis, of Calvinist Hungarian noble descent.
Korányi Jr. graduated in Budapest and other universities in Europe. He served as the general manager of the National Central Credit Co-operative from 1912. In 1922 he joined to the Unity Party, which controlled Hungary during the Regency. Between 1923 and 1924 he was the ambassador to France, after his second short ministership he returned to this position.

In 1928 he was appointed to lead of the Banking Centre. After that he served as Minister of Finance again. He became a member of the House of Magnates in 1932. Korányi also dealt with literature in his spare time: he wrote plays and novels, for example Hajnalhasadás (Sunrise) - 1900.

References
 Magyar Életrajzi Lexikon

1869 births
1935 deaths
People from Pest, Hungary
Finance ministers of Hungary
Jewish Hungarian politicians
Frigyes 2
Ambassadors of Hungary to France